CCMA may refer to:

Central Committee of Anti-Fascist Militias, during the Lluís Companys's government of Catalonia, in the Spanish Revolution
Canadian Country Music Association, the association of the Canadian country music industry
Catholic Campus Ministry Association
Closure & Container Manufacturers Association, a trade association of manufacturers who produce closures and containers
Corporació Catalana de Mitjans Audiovisuals, the public radio and television corporation in Catalonia
Canadian Cascade Magmatic Arc, a geological formation in southwestern British Columbia, Canada
Check Point Certified Master Architect, a certification from Check Point